West Yellowstone is a town in Gallatin County, Montana, United States, adjacent to Yellowstone National Park. The population was 1,272 at the 2020 census. West Yellowstone is served by Yellowstone Airport. It is part of the Bozeman, MT Micropolitan Statistical Area.

West Yellowstone offers lodging, gift shops, and other services to travelers visiting nearby Yellowstone National Park.

History
Founded in June 1908 when the Oregon Short Line Railroad was completed, the town's name changed several times until West Yellowstone was settled upon in 1920. Train service to West Yellowstone ended in 1960. The town was incorporated in 1966.

Geography

Climate
At almost 7,000 feet above sea level and almost exactly halfway between the equator and the North Pole, West Yellowstone experiences a subarctic climate (Köppen climate classification Dfc), with cold — sometimes bitterly cold — winters and brief but generally warm summers. West Yellowstone is snow-covered from the beginning of November until the beginning of May. At the peak of the snowpack, which typically occurs in early March, there are 3.5 – 4 feet of snow on the ground. In 2007-2008, West Yellowstone had snow on the ground from late October until mid May, with 4.5 feet of snow by late March.

Demographics

2010 census
As of the census of 2010, there were 1,271 people, 617 households, and 298 families residing in the town. The racial makeup of the town was 86.6% White, 0.4% African American, 1.1% Native American, 0.9% Asian, 7.5% from other races, and 3.5% from two or more races. Hispanic or Latino of any race were 17.9% of the population.

There were 617 households, of which 23.7% had children under the age of 18 living with them, 34.7% were married couples living together, 8.4% had a female householder with no husband present, 5.2% had a male householder with no wife present, and 51.7% were non-families. 42.1% of all households were made up of individuals, and 5.8% had someone living alone who was 65 years of age or older. The average household size was 2.06, and the average family size was 2.86.

The median age in the town was 39.4 years. 20.9% of residents were under the age of 18; 6.5% were between the ages of 18 and 24; 30.1% were from 25 to 44; 34.2% were from 45 to 64; and 8.4% were 65 years of age or older. The gender makeup of the town was 53.1% male and 46.9% female.

2000 census
As of the census of 2000, there were 1,177 people, 518 households, and 289 families residing in the town. The racial makeup of the town was 91.93% White, 0.34% African American, 0.85% Native American, 0.76% Asian, 4.84% from other races, and 1.27% from two or more races. Hispanic or Latino of any race were 7.73% of the population.

There were 518 households, out of which 26.8% had children under the age of 18 living with them, 42.9% were married couples living together, 8.9% had a female householder with no husband present, and 44.2% were non-families. 34.4% of all households were made up of individuals, and 2.5% had someone living alone who was 65 years of age or older. The average household size was 2.15 and the average family size was 2.76.

In the town, the population was spread out, with 22.4% under the age of 18, 7.9% from 18 to 24, 35.9% from 25 to 44, 28.5% from 45 to 64, and 5.3% who were 65 years of age or older. The median age was 37 years. For every 100 females there were 123.3 males. For every 100 females age 18 and over, there were 121.1 males.

The median income for a household in the town was $30,703, and the median income for a family was $37,250. Males had a median income of $24,297 versus $20,909 for females. The per capita income for the town was $19,136. About 9.1% of families and 12.9% of the population were below the poverty line, including 18.2% of those under age 18 and 5.1% of those age 65 or over.

Economy

Tourism
Because of its proximity to Yellowstone National Park, the town receives a large amount of tourism, especially from China. To cater to these tourists, the town has commercial signage in Mandarin as well as six Chinese restaurants. It is estimated to receive more than half its annual business from Chinese tourists.

Education
The town has one school, the West Yellowstone School, serving kindergarten through 12th grade. West Yellowstone High School is a class C school (less than 108 students) which helps determine athletic competitions. They are known as the Wolverines.

West Yellowstone Public Library serves the area.

Media
KWYS (AM), broadcasting at 920 kHz and locally owned by Radio West, LLC, is located in and licensed to West Yellowstone.

Infrastructure

Layout
The D Parkway road roughly separates the town into residential and commercial areas. South of D Parkway is mainly a business/commercial area, while northward is a residential area of homes and apartments. The area north of D Parkway is known to locals as the "Madison Addition".

Transportation
The West Yellowstone Airport, a mainly summer-operating airport, is to the north of town.

U.S. Route 20 and U.S. Route 191 pass through the town.

The Union Pacific Railroad historically operated the Butte Special, (29/30) which linked with a coordinated train, the Yellowstone Special, (35/36) which ran from Pocatello, Idaho to West Yellowstone. The two trains ran linked from Pocatello to Idaho Falls, where the latter train split off for West Yellowstone. Service ended in 1971.

See also
 Angling in Yellowstone National Park

References

External links

 Town of West Yellowstone
 West Yellowstone Chamber of Commerce and Visitor Information Center

Towns in Gallatin County, Montana
Populated places established in 1909